Annabel Guye-Johnson (born 15 March) is a Kent County youth swimming champion. She was the 2016 50 meter breaststroke British Champion. In 2017 she represented the UK at the FINA World Junior championships in Indianapolis, where she won a bronze medal in the 200 meter Breaststroke.

References

Living people
Year of birth missing (living people)
Sportspeople from Kent
English female swimmers
English breaststroke swimmers